The Stephen Haller Gallery is a contemporary art gallery in Midtown Manhattan, New York City. The gallery exhibits significant, contemporary painting and is known for presenting paintings imbued with rich textures and surfaces. Stephen Haller Gallery represents artists Michel Alexis, Kate O'Donovan Cook, Nobu Fukui, Catherine Gfeller, Johannes Girardoni, Gregory Johnston, Sam Jury, Ronnie Landfield, Lloyd Martin, Kathy Moss, Michael Mulhearn, Johnnie Winona Ross, Linda Stojak, and Larry Zox.

References

External links 
 
 Pia Catton on the Summer Gallery Scene

Haller, Stephen
Contemporary art galleries in the United States
Art museums and galleries in Manhattan
Chelsea, Manhattan